Swedish progressive house supergroup Swedish House Mafia have released one studio album, two compilation albums, two live albums, two EPs, ten singles, and nine music videos. The trio formed during the mid-2000s whilst touring together and assisting each other in music production, and released the single "Leave the World Behind" in 2009, although all were assigned individual artist credits for the song. The group itself rose to prominence after performing a DJ set at the Cream Amnesia nightclub in Ibiza in 2008, and were later signed by record label EMI in 2010. Until One, a compilation album containing both their own material and mixes of songs by other artists, peaked at number 13 in Sweden and in the top ten of the album charts of The Netherlands and the Flanders region of Belgium: two singles, "One" and "Miami 2 Ibiza", both attained chart success across Europe, with the former topping the Dutch Top 40 and the latter reaching the top five of the Flanders chart, Irish Singles Chart and UK Singles Chart. "One" and "Miami 2 Ibiza" were certified septuple and quintuple platinum in Sweden by the International Federation of the Phonographic Industry (IFPI).

The follow-up to Until One, titled Until Now, was released in 2012. Again a compilation containing a mix of their own songs and those by other artists, it peaked at number three in Sweden as well as topping the UK Compilation Chart. Four singles were released from Until Now: "Save the World", "Antidote" – a collaboration with Australian electro house group Knife Party – "Greyhound" and "Don't You Worry Child", with the latter proving to be the most successful: it became their first song to peak at number one in Sweden, and also topped the ARIA Chart and UK Singles Chart. During 2012, the group announced that they would split up following the conclusion of their One Last Tour. Swedish House Mafia reunited in 2018 and their debut album, Paradise Again, was released on 15 April 2022. In collaboration with Canadian singer The Weeknd, the trio released "Moth to a Flame" on 22 October 2021.

Albums

Studio albums

Compilation albums

Live albums

Extended plays

Singles

Other charted songs

Productions

Remixes

Music videos

Notes

See also 
Steve Angello discography
Axwell discography
Sebastian Ingrosso discography

References

External links 
 
 

Discographies of Swedish artists
Electronic music discographies